Jesse Kanda (born June 23, 1987) is an artist, animator and musician based in London. He was born in Japan and raised in Canada. Besides his solo career as an artist and musician, he is also well known for his collaborations with musicians including Arca, FKA Twigs and Björk as well as providing visuals for fashion label Hood By Air.

Background
Jesse Kanda partly grew up in Japan. Since age 13, Kanda has shared his work online with the advent of artistic social networks deviantArt.com and mp3.com in the early 2000s. Today he continues to do so, now expanding into exhibitions and live shows. He is known for his collaborations with musician Arca who he met "on a DeviantArt forum when Kanda was 15 and Arca was 13."

Jesse Kanda was nominated for a Grammy Award for Best Recording Package during the 57th edition of the event (2015) for FKA Twigs's debut studio album LP1.

Work 
Common themes in Kanda's work have been growth, decay, death, freedom, fantasy, empathy, dream, innocence, subconscious, sexuality, sensuality, pain, suffering, euphoria, the body, movement, and magic.

Kanda often employs a unique balance of aesthetic beauty and the grotesque. Juxtaposing life and death; or love and fear. Although he is mostly known for his sculptural mixed media images, animations and music, he has also ventured into traditional filmmaking, sculpture, fashion, painting and photography.

His figures often exist in a dream-like spatial environment, often disfigured but with a sense of empathy and strength. His visual works are sometimes inspired by internal body parts, and Kanda admits "The inside of our body is much more beautiful than the skin that coats it, yet we’re afraid of it." Kanda transforms painful organ-looking heuristics into esthetic visual pieces.

He has often used the music video as his artistic medium. Either creating the music himself, or collaborating with close friends.

In 2020 he provided visuals for beauty company Byredo.

Music video credits
 FKA Twigs – "How's That" (2013)
 FKA Twigs – "Water Me" (2013)
 Arca – "Thievery" (2014) 
 Arca – "Now You Know" (2014)
 Arca – "Xen" (2014)
 Arca – "Sad Bitch" (2015)
 Wench – "Galvanize" (2015)
 Björk – "Mouth Mantra" (2015)
 Arca – "Front Load" (2016)
 doon kanda – "Axolotl" (2017)
 doon kanda – "Womb" (2017)
 Arca – "Desafío" (2017)
 Arca – "Anoche" (2017)
 Arca – "Reverie" (2017)
 Björk – "Arisen My Senses" (2017)

Album art credits
 Arca – &&&&& (2013)
 FKA Twigs – LP1 (2014)
 Arca – Xen (2014)
 Arca – Sheep (2015)
 Arca – Mutant (2015)
 Arca – Entrañas (2016)
 doon kanda – Heart (2017)
 Arca – Arca (2017)
 Björk – Utopia (2017)
 doon kanda – Luna (2018)

Exhibitions & performances
 TRAUMA – MoMA PS1 (2013)
 Various live shows with Arca (2013–2017)
 Solo exhibition and musical performance London Corsica Studios (2017)
 Solo exhibition and musical performance Tokyo Liquid Room (2017)
 Solo exhibition and musical performance Kyoto Metro (2017)

Discography 
Albums
 Labyrinth (2019)
 Galatea (2022)
 Celest (2023)

EPs
 Heart (2017)
 Luna (2018)

References

1987 births
People from Kanagawa Prefecture
Digital artists
Japanese animators
Canadian animators
Living people
Japanese expatriates in England